Erebus glaucopis, the Himalayan blue owl-moth is a moth of the family Erebidae. It is found in Bangladesh, the north-western Himalayas, China, Nepal and Thailand.

References

Moths described in 1858
Erebus (moth)